Sonic Anime may refer to:
The opening and closing FMV sequences of Sonic CD
Sonic the Hedgehog, a two-episode OVA created by Studio Pierrot and released in 1996
Sonic X, a full-length anime television series created by TMS Entertainment and broadcast from 2003 to 2004
The opening sequence of Sonic Riders